The 2004–05 Football League Championship (known as the Coca-Cola Championship for sponsorship reasons) was the thirteenth season under its current league division format. It began in August 2004 and concluded in May 2005, with the promotion play-off finals. This was the first season to feature the rebranded Football League. The First Division, Second Division and Third Division were renamed the Football League Championship, Football League One and Football League Two respectively. Coca-Cola replaced the Nationwide Building Society as title sponsor.

The winners of the Championship in 2005 are Sunderland. Wigan Athletic reached the Premiership as Championship runners-up and became the first club to make a debut in the top tier of English football since Barnsley's promotion after the 1996–97 season. They had been elected to the Football League only 27 years earlier, had been the league's fourth lowest club eleven years earlier and had never played in the upper half of The Football League until two years before reaching the Premier League. Nottingham Forest were relegated from the Championship to League One, becoming the first former European Cup winners to slide into the third tier of their domestic league – having won two straight European Cups a quarter of a century earlier. Just ten years ago they had finished third in the Premiership and reached the following season's UEFA Cup quarter finals.

Changes from last season

From Championship
Promoted to Premier League
 Norwich City
 West Bromwich Albion
 Crystal Palace

Relegated to League One
 Walsall
 Bradford City
 Wimbledon

To Championship
Relegated from Premier League
 Leicester City
 Leeds United
 Wolverhampton Wanderers

Promoted from League One
 Plymouth Argyle
 Queens Park Rangers
 Brighton & Hove Albion

League table

Play-offs

Results

Stadia

External links
 Football League Tables

 
EFL Championship seasons
1
Eng
2004–05 in English football leagues